Xev, XEV or  can refer to:
 XEV, vehicle manufacturer
 Xev Bellringer, previously Zev Bellringer, A fictional character from a sci-fi TV series Lexx
 Stockholm Central Station (IATA airport code XEV)
 XEV-AM, a radio station in Chihuahua that is now on FM as XHV-FM